The president of Tsinghua University is the chief administrator of Tsinghua University, a national public research university in Beijing, China. After 1992, each president of Tsinghua University is appointed by and is responsible to the Central Committee of the Chinese Communist Party and the State Council, who delegate to him or her the day-to-day running of the university.

The university's current president is Wang Xiqin, who assumed the office in February 2022.

Presidents of Tsinghua University

Communist Party Secretaries of Tsinghua University

References

External links

Tsinghua University
Presidents of Tsinghua University
Tsinghua University